The 2000 Ottawa municipal election was a municipal election that was held on November 13, 2000, in Ottawa. The elections were held for mayor of Ottawa, Ottawa City Council and a number of school trustees. These elections would mark the first for the newly amalgamated city, which added 10 former municipalities to Ottawa. At the time of the city elections, the amalgamation had not occurred yet; the official date of that happened on January 1, 2001.

Mayoral race
The race for mayor only had two major candidates, that of the Chair of the Regional Municipality of Ottawa-Carleton, Bob Chiarelli and the mayor of the City of Gloucester, Claudette Cain. Cain did very well in her native Gloucester, as well as in the more francophone areas like Cumberland and Vanier. Bob Chiarelli won most of the other wards, including one that was partly in Gloucester. His strongest showing was in Kanata and Kitchissippi Ward.

The election had few major issues surrounding it, with Chiarelli's main debate issue being a plan to recapitalize Hydro Ottawa to help finance infrastructure projects. Chiarelli was seen as a "solid, no-frills and experience politicians who quietly gets the job done", running an "amorphous, centrist" campaign. Cain was the underdog in the campaign and campaigned on cutting taxes and a "go-slow approach" to infrastructure in contrast to Chiarelli.

Results

City council

The city council elections were very fierce, because many wards faced incumbents against each other because of the amalgamation. In the rural areas, some mayors ran for city council.

Results:

School trustee races

Ottawa-Carleton District School Board Trustees

Ottawa-Carleton Catholic School Board Trustees

Conseil des écoles catholiques de langue française du Centre-Est Trustees

Conseil des écoles publiques de l'Est de l'Ontario Trustees

References

External links
 results

Municipal elections in Ottawa
2000 Ontario municipal elections
2000s in Ottawa